The 1996 XXXII FIBA International Christmas Tournament "Trofeo Raimundo Saporta-Memorial Fernando Martín" was the 32nd edition of the FIBA International Christmas Tournament. It took place at Palacio de Deportes de la Comunidad de Madrid, Madrid, Spain, on 24, 25 and 26 December 1996 with the participations of Real Madrid Teka, Olympiacos (champions of the 1995–96 Greek Basket League), Efes Pilsen (champions of the 1995–96 FIBA Korać Cup) and Scavolini Pesaro (ranked 7th in the 1995–96 Serie A1 FIP).

League stage

Day 1, December 24, 1996

|}

Day 2, December 25, 1996

|}

Day 3, December 26, 1996

|}

Final standings

References

1996–97 in European basketball
1996–97 in Greek basketball
1996–97 in Italian basketball
1996–97 in Spanish basketball
1996–97 in Turkish basketball